The Tefft-Steadman House in Marcellus, New York is a Greek Revival-style house that was designed by major architect Minard Lafever.  (Or is it just from one of his pattern books?)

It was built in 1835, apparently faithfully implementing a design from architect Minard Lafever's pattern-book, and was listed on the National Register of Historic Places in 2007.

The house is now operated as a local history museum by the Marcellus Historical Society.

References

External links
 Marcellus Historical Society
 History of the Steadman House - Marcellus Historical Society

Houses on the National Register of Historic Places in New York (state)
Houses completed in 1835
Houses in Onondaga County, New York
Museums in Onondaga County, New York
Historical society museums in New York (state)
National Register of Historic Places in Onondaga County, New York